Italian for Beginners is a 2000 Danish romantic comedy film written and directed by Lone Scherfig, and starring Anders W. Berthelsen, Lars Kaalund and Peter Gantzler, together with Ann Eleonora Jørgensen, Anette Støvelbæk and Sara Indrio Jensen. The film was made by the austere principles of the Dogme 95 movement, including the use of handheld video cameras and natural lighting, and is known as Dogme XII. However, in contrast to most Dogme films which are harsh and serious in tone, Italian for Beginners is a light-hearted comedy. It was made on a $600,000 budget, and went on to gross over 27 times that.

After the film's release, significant similarities between its plot and that of the novel Evening Class by Maeve Binchy were identified. The distributor, Zentropa, paid an undisclosed sum in compensation to Binchy.

Plot 
Andreas, a widowed pastor, arrives in a Danish suburb to take over religious duties from the previous pastor who, due to a crisis of faith after his own wife's death, has become irreligious and even punched the organist, causing him to be hospitalized. Believing his stay will be temporary, Andreas stays in the local hotel where he meets one of the employees, Jørgen Mortensen, who is suffering a crisis as he has been asked to fire the temperamental Hal-Finn who works in the hotel restaurant and is also his best friend. Hal-Finn goes to visit hairdresser Karen and is immediately attracted to her, though his visit is cut short when she must go to the hospital to attend to her alcoholic mother.

Meanwhile, clumsy baker Olympia tends to her disabled and abusive father, who constantly berates her. Olympia decides to join a beginner Italian class in order to feel closer to her Italian mother, but the night she joins the class, the instructor dies. She returns home to find that her own father has died as well. Sometime later she learns that her estranged mother has died as well. At her funeral, she meets Karen, and the two discover that they are sisters and that their parents split them up when they divorced. In order to protect Olympia, Karen does not tell her that their mother was not Italian and was an alcoholic.

After finally being fired for being rude to customers, Hal-Finn becomes the Italian teacher and Olympia persuades both Andreas and her sister to join. Karen and Hal-Finn begin a romantic affair but during Christmas Karen overhears Hal-Finn disparaging her mother, and angrily ends their relationship. Jørgen approaches Andreas for advice about his impotence and his trouble talking to Hal-Finn's Italian friend Giulia, and decides to ask her out for a walk.

In the meantime Olympia receives a letter from the bank telling her of a large inheritance from her father. She decides to spend it taking the Italian class to Venice. In Venice, Jørgen proposes to Giulia who accepts, Karen forgives Hal-Finn after he cuts off his too-long bangs, and Andreas suggests that Olympia, whose clumsy behaviour has caused her to be fired from 43 jobs, come to work as a chorister. He then reveals that he plans to stay in the parish.

Cast 
 Anders W. Berthelsen as Andreas
 Anette Støvelbæk as Olympia
 Ann Eleonora Jørgensen as Karen
 Peter Gantzler as Jørgen Mortensen
 Lars Kaalund as Hal-Finn
 Sara Indrio Jensen as Giulia
 Karen-Lise Mynster as Kirsten, the real estate dealer
 Rikke Wölck as Lise, the nurse
 Elsebeth Steentoft as Kirketjener
 Bent Mejding as Reverend Wredmann
 Lene Tiemroth as Karen's mother
 Claus Gerving as Klaus Graversen
 Jesper Christensen as Olympia's father

Reception

Critical reception 
On review aggregator website Rotten Tomatoes, the film has an approval rating of 88% based on 85 reviews, and an average rating of 7.2/10. The website's critical consensus reads, "Unlike many romantic comedies, the charming Italian for Beginners feels natural and genuinely heart-warming." On Metacritic, the film has a weighted average score of 77 out of 100, based on 28 critics, indicating "generally favorable reviews".

Accolades 
The film won the Jury Grand Prix Silver Bear at the Berlin Film Festival, the Golden Spike Award for the best film of the year at the Seminci film festival in Valladolid, Spain, and the Audience Award at the Warsaw International Film Festival in Poland. Peter Gantzler won the award for Best Actor at the Seminci festival. The film also won the Gold Dolphin (Best Film) at the Festroia International Film Festival in 2001.

References

Literature 
 Mette Hjort, Lone Scherfig's Italian for Beginners, Museum Tusculanum Press, 2010. .

External links 
 
 
  FILM FESTIVAL REVIEW; "Finding the Right Spark for a Guy With a Problem" New York Times 2 October 2001

2000 films
2000 romantic comedy films
Camcorder films
2000s Danish-language films
2000s English-language films
Films about language
Films based on Irish novels
Films directed by Lone Scherfig
Films set in Venice
2000s Italian-language films
2000 multilingual films
Danish multilingual films
Danish romantic comedy films
Dogme 95 films